The 2011 Quebec Men's Provincial Curling Championship (also known as the Quebec Tankard) was held January 30-February 6 at the Centre sportif de Buckingham in Buckingham, Quebec.  The winning team of François Gagné represented Quebec at the 2011 Tim Hortons Brier in London, Ontario.

Teams

Standings

Results

Draw 1
January 31, 12:00 PM

Draw 2
January 31, 7:45 PM

Draw 3
February 1, 12:00 PM

Draw 4
February 1, 7:30 PM

Draw 5
February 2, 8:15 AM

Draw 6
February 2, 3:45 PM

Draw 7
February 3, 8:15 AM

Draw 8
February 3, 3:30 PM

Draw 9
February 4, 12:00 PM

Tie Breaker
February 4, 3:45 PM

Playoffs

1 vs. 2
February 5, 2:00 PM

3 vs. 4
February 5, 2:00 PM

Semifinal
February 5, 7:00 PM

Final
February 6, 4:00 PM

References

Quebec Mens Provincial Curling Championship, 2011
Curling competitions in Quebec
Sport in Gatineau
Men's Provincial Curling Championship
Quebec Men's Provincial Curling Championship
Quebec Men's Provincial Curling Championship